Conjuring the Dead is the tenth studio album by the Austrian blackened death metal band Belphegor. It was released on 5 August 2014 through Nuclear Blast. The album was recorded by Erik Rutan at Mana Recording Studios in the United States. The album was preceded by the digital download single, "Gasmask Terror", which was released on 1 July 2014. Earlier, on 25 June, a lyric video for the same song was released.

A music video was shot for the title track, which was directed by Walter Fanninger. The album features cover art by Septicflesh bassist Seth Siro Anton.

Track listing
All arrangements by Helmuth Lehner.

Critical reception

After its release, Conjuring the Dead received mixed to positive reviews from music critics. Dave Schalek of About.com said  "[...] a densely heavy album with a bludgeoning production courtesy of Erik Rutan, and chock full of excellent songwriting and musicianship. Although fast with plenty of blastbeats, Conjuring The Dead is at its best when Belphegor slow things down to a mid-paced tempo with catchy riffs and deliver an epic sweep to the music." Sammy O'hagar of MetalSucks noted that "Everything is in perfect balance, which is both exhilarating and dangerous. Conjuring the Dead is the ideal snapshot of blackened death metal. It weaves the two genres together seamlessly, then pulls them both apart so each can shine then wonderfully segue back into each other. The blackened parts display a relentless near-grindcore ferocity."

Tony Vilgotsky of Russian metal magazine Dark City rated this album with five out of five stars. He recommended the record "to anyone who respects genuine extreme metal and true heaviness."

Personnel

"Gasmask Terror"
"Gasmask Terror" is the second single by Belphegor. It was released on 1 July 2014 by Nuclear Blast.

Track listing

Charts

Release history

References
   

Belphegor albums
2014 albums
Nuclear Blast albums
Albums with cover art by Spiros Antoniou
German-language albums